Cake Pop 2 is the debut studio album by American band Cake Pop, consisting of Dylan Brady, Ravenna Golden, Cali Cartier, Lewis Grant, Kevin Bedford, Pritty, Adam Newcomer, and Robel Ketema. The album is the sequel to their 2015 self-titled EP, and was released on April 30, 2021, by Mad Decent. It was promoted by the singles "Black Rum" and "Satin Bedsheets".

Composition
Cake Pop 2 is a hyperpop, experimental pop, happy hardcore, and alt-rap album with elements of dancehall, trance, and EDM.

Critical reception

Sophie Walker, writing for The Forty-Five called the album "fun" but lacking creativity, saying " If Cake Pop only wanted to push the envelope just that little bit further to find new, uncharted territory in an increasingly rigid hyperpop universe – and to have fun doing it – then Cake Pop 2 truly is a thing of great, rowdy, ridiculous beauty." Joshua Bote of Pitchfork called the album "a lively introduction to Cake Pop and its members, but as the sounds of Brady’s busy schedule leak in, there’s a sense that we’ve heard most of it before. Though the production flexes to fit the eccentricities of each song, the tailoring could have been closer."

Track listing

References

2021 debut albums
Mad Decent albums
Albums produced by Dylan Brady
Hyperpop albums
Experimental pop albums
Alternative hip hop albums by American artists
Experimental music albums by American artists
Pop albums by American artists